Alamo is a city in Wheeler County, Georgia, United States. As of the 2020 census, the city had a population of 771.  The city is the county seat of Wheeler County.

History
Alamo was founded in 1890 as a stop on the Seaboard Air Line Railroad. It was named for the Alamo Mission in San Antonio, Texas. Alamo was chartered in 1909.

Alamo's courthouse was built in 1917 and is on the National Register of Historical Places. The Lamplighter Little Theatre dates back to 1919.

Geography

The main soil in and around Alamo is Tifton loamy sand.

Demographics

2020 census

As of the 2020 United States census, there were 771 people, 760 households, and 492 families residing in the town.

2000 census
As of the census of 2000, there were 1,943 people, 363 households, and 255 families residing in the city. The racial makeup of the city was 46.37% White, 52.60% African American, 0.57% from other races, and 0.46% from two or more races. Hispanic or Latino of any race were 0.93% of the population.

There were 363 households, out of which 33.9% had children under the age of 18 living with them, 44.4% were married couples living together, 21.5% had a female householder with no husband present, and 29.5% were non-families. 28.1% of all households were made up of individuals, and 16.0% had someone living alone who was 65 years of age or older.  The average household size was 2.58 and the average family size was 3.14.

In the city, the population was spread out, with 14.3% under the age of 18, 14.1% from 18 to 24, 44.9% from 25 to 44, 19.4% from 45 to 64, and 7.4% who were 65 years of age or older.  The median age was 35 years. For every 100 females, there were 257.8 males.  For every 100 females age 18 and over, there were 323.9 males.

The median income for a household in the city was $25,000, and the median income for a family was $30,125. Males had a median income of $25,921 versus $20,208 for females. The per capita income for the city was $8,147.  About 24.9% of families and 24.8% of the population were below the poverty line, including 30.4% of those under age 18 and 25.6% of those age 65 or over.

Education

Wheeler County School District 
The Wheeler County School District holds grades pre-school to grade 12, and consists of one elementary school and a middle-high school. The district has 82 full-time teachers and over 1,150 students.
Wheeler County Elementary School
Wheeler County High School

References

Cities in Georgia (U.S. state)
Cities in Wheeler County, Georgia
County seats in Georgia (U.S. state)
Populated places established in 1890
1890 establishments in Georgia (U.S. state)